Mohamed Chemlal (born 8 February 1995) is a French footballer who plays as a midfielder for Mantes.

Career

In 2012, Chemlal signed for Boulogne in the French third division from the reserves of French Ligue 1 side Caen.

In 2016, he signed for Forest Green Rovers in the English fifth division from French fifth division club Le Havre B, where the captain did not like him due to them playing the same position.

Before the second half of the 2017–18 season, Chemlal signed for Vereya in the Bulgarian top flight after playing for English sixth division team Weston-super-Mare, before returning to France due to the death of his father.

In 2018, he signed for Mantes in the French fourth division.

References

External links
 
 

Living people
1995 births
People from Mantes-la-Jolie
French sportspeople of Moroccan descent
French footballers
Association football midfielders
France youth international footballers
Championnat National players
Championnat National 2 players
Championnat National 3 players
National League (English football) players
First Professional Football League (Bulgaria) players
FC Mantois 78 players
Stade Malherbe Caen players
US Boulogne players
Forest Green Rovers F.C. players
Weston-super-Mare A.F.C. players
FC Vereya players
Red Star F.C. players
French expatriate footballers
French expatriate sportspeople in England
Expatriate footballers in England
French expatriate sportspeople in Bulgaria
Expatriate footballers in Bulgaria